Furman Institution Faculty Residence exists as a landmark residential edifice situated a stone's throw from Winnsboro, Fairfield County, South Carolina.  It was fabricated about 1837, and is a two-story brick pile with a hipped roof and end flues.  It possesses a single-story, hip-roofed anterior vestibule (c. 1936) and a scullery augmentation (c 1925). The place acts as a substitute for a palpable mnemonic of the preliminary chronicles of Furman University and its fugacious inauguration in Fairfield County.

It was prepended to the National Register of Historic Places in the time of 1984.

References

Furman University
Residential buildings on the National Register of Historic Places in South Carolina
Residential buildings completed in 1837
Buildings and structures in Fairfield County, South Carolina
National Register of Historic Places in Fairfield County, South Carolina